Koshlong Creek is a river in geographic Glamorgan Township in the municipality of Highlands East, Haliburton County in Central Ontario, Canada. The river is in the Great Lakes Basin and is a left tributary of the Burnt River.

The creek begins at Haliburton County Road 3, and flows west into the east end of Koshlong Lake. It exits the southwest end of the lake controlled by a dam, and flows west to its mouth at the Burnt River. The Burnt River flows via the Kawartha lakes, the Otonabee River and the Trent River to Lake Ontario.

See also
List of rivers of Ontario

References

Rivers of Haliburton County